Kim Lucine (born 16 September 1988) is a French figure skater who skates internationally for Monaco. He is the 2010 Ondrej Nepela Memorial silver medalist and 2013 Nordic bronze medalist.

Career
Lucine represented France intentionally at the novice and junior level. Following a knee injury, he began competing for Monaco in the 2010-2011 season. He made his Europeans and Worlds debut that season, finishing 17th and 23rd, respectively. In 2012, he moved up to 13th at the European Championships and again finished 23rd at Worlds.

Lucine is coached by his father.

Programs

Results

For Monaco

For France

References

External links

 Official site 
 

French male single skaters
Monegasque figure skaters
1988 births
Living people
Sportspeople from Annecy